Human rights in Somaliland are protected by Chapter one, Part three of the Constitution of Somaliland. Somaliland is an unrecognised sovereign state in the Horn of Africa, internationally considered to be part of Somalia. 

Amnesty International criticizes the persistence of the death penalty and cases of controversial detentions and trials in Somaliland.

In January 2007, the editor and several journalists of the Haatuf newspaper were arrested because they had "defamed" the president's family with their corruption allegations. Under pressure from Somalilander expats and local media, the government released the journalists after 86 days in custody.  Other journalists dealing with corruption were also victims of intimidation.
Asylum seekers from the Ethiopian regions of Somali and Oromia, who are suspected of supporting the separatist Ogaden National Liberation Front (ONLF) or the Oromo Liberation Front, have been repatriated to Ethiopia at the request of the Ethiopian government. According to human rights organizations, these people are at risk of arbitrary detention and torture. However, this order was not carried out.

As of 2009, Freedom House names the following human rights problems in Somaliland: corruption, interference and harassment of journalists, banning non-Islamic proselytizing, banning public demonstrations, lack of due process and prolonged detention before trial, weak judiciary and female genital mutilation.

Freedom of expression
It is forbidden in Somaliland to promote the unity of Somaliland with Somalia, or to wear the flag of Somalia, which endangers the security of the powerful, according to the Somaliland Constitution of 2001, which affirmed the independence of Somaliland from Somalia.

References

External links
Somaliland human rights law
Somaliland National Human Rights Commission

Human rights in Somaliland
Politics of Somaliland
Society of Somaliland